Senator Ramirez or Ramírez may refer to:

Florencio Ramirez (1915–1995), Senate of Guam
Graco Ramírez (born 1949), Senate of Mexico
Heladio Ramírez (born 1939), Senate of Mexico
Itzamar Peña Ramírez (born 1974), Senate of Puerto Rico
Juan Andrés Ramírez (born 1947), Senate of Uruguay
Juan Gerardo Flores Ramírez (born 1968), Senate of Mexico
Juan Lozano Ramírez (born 1964), Senate of Colombia
Marta Lucía Ramírez (born 1954), Senate of Colombia
Miriam Ramírez (born 1941), Senate of Puerto Rico
Severo Colberg Ramírez (1924–1990), Senate of Puerto Rico
Victor R. Ramirez (born 1974), Maryland State Senate